Arabs Got Talent is an Arab reality television talent show broadcast by MBC 1 in the Arab world; it is produced by the MBC and was first broadcast on 14 January 2011. The show features contestants with a variety of talents, such as singing, break-dancing, comedians, magicians, and rapping. The show features three celebrity judges, popular in the Middle East. They currently are Lebanese singer Najwa Karam; the dean of the journalism school at the American University in Dubai Ali Jaber; and Ahmed Helmy, an Egyptian actor. The show's venue is in Lebanon.

Though entry into the semi-finals is based on the judges' vote, the voting in the semi-finals and final is an audience vote, akin to other Got Talent shows. The grand prize is 500,000 Saudi Riyals and a brand new Chrysler 300 as well as a contract with MBC.

The show finished its second season on June 29, 2012. The third season started airing September 14 moving its timeslot from Fridays to Saturdays. The fourth season began airing on December 20. The fifth season ended May 20, 2017, with eight-year-old opera singer Emanne Beasha winning.

The show is hosted by Saudi rapper and musician Qusai and Lebanese TV presenter Raya Abirached.

Presenters and judges

Selection process

Producers' auditions 

Contestants are initially chosen at non-televised auditions in the capitals of participating Arab country, such as Doha in Qatar.

Judges' auditions 

Chosen contestants proceed to perform in front of the celebrity judges. It is by the judges' votes that they enter the next round. Judges may terminate a contestant's performance by buzzing in, signifying an X. However, buzzes from all judges are required to stop the performance. These auditions are televised weekly on Saturdays on MBC4.

Live shows 

The semi-finals and final are broadcast live. They feature performances by the contestants, usually on a grander scale. Judges can still stop a performance if all three buzz in, three times. In the semi-final, the winners are chosen by the viewers' voting (by means of texting), though only the most-voted-for contestant proceeds to the final, the second and third placed proceed via a vote by the judges.

In the final, fourteen contestants remain and, after each contestant finishes their performance, the winner is chosen by the viewers' voting.

Seasons overview

References

External links 
 

Got Talent
Television series by Fremantle (company)
2011 television series debuts
Non-British television series based on British television series